The Roman Catholic Diocese of Bafoussam is a diocese located in the city of Bafoussam in the Ecclesiastical province of Douala in Cameroon.

History
 February 5, 1970: Established as Diocese of Bafoussam from the Diocese of Nkongsamba

Special churches
The cathedral is the Cathédrale Saint-Joseph in Bafoussam.

Bishops
 Bishops of Bafoussam (Latin Rite)
 Denis Ngande (February 5, 1970  – February 28, 1978)
 André Wouking (March 15, 1979  – November 27, 1998), appointed Archbishop of Yaoundé
 Joseph Atanga, S.J. (June 22, 1999  – December 3, 2009), appointed Archbishop of Bertoua
 Dieudonné Watio (March 5, 2011  – March 19, 2021)
 Paul Lontsié-Keuné (November 27, 2021 - Present)

Auxiliary bishops
Gabriel Simo (1994-2013)
Emmanuel Dassi Youfang, Comm. l'Emm. (2016-2020) , appointed Bishop of Bafia

Other priest of this diocese who became bishop
Paul Lontsié-Keuné, appointed Bishop of Yokadouma in 2017

See also
Roman Catholicism in Cameroon

References

External links
 GCatholic.org

Bafoussam
Christian organizations established in 1970
Roman Catholic dioceses and prelatures established in the 20th century
Roman Catholic Ecclesiastical Province of Douala